Dichaetura is a genus of gastrotrichs belonging to the family Dichaeturidae.

The species of this genus are found in Europe.

Species:

Dichaetura capricornia 
Dichaetura filispina 
Dichaetura piscator 
Dichaetura surreyi

References

Gastrotricha